1058 Grubba, provisional designation , is a stony Flora asteroid from the inner regions of the asteroid belt. It was discovered on 22 June 1925, by Soviet–Russian astronomer Grigory Shajn at the Simeiz Observatory on the Crimean peninsula. The S-type asteroid was named for Irish telescope maker Howard Grubb.

Orbit and classification 

Grubba is a member of the Flora family, a giant asteroid family and the largest family of stony asteroids in the main-belt. It has also been grouped into the Augusta family by Vincenzo Zappalà in a previous study in the 1990s, also using the hierarchical clustering method. The Augusta family, named after 254 Augusta, can be considered a sub-family of the Flora-complex.

It orbits the Sun in the inner asteroid belt at a distance of 1.8–2.6 AU once every 3 years and 3 months (1,189 days; semi-major axis of 2.2 AU). Its orbit has an eccentricity of 0.19 and an inclination of 4° with respect to the ecliptic.

The body's observation arc begins with a precovery taken at the Yerkes Observatory in November 1932, or more than 7 years after its official discovery observation at Simeiz.

Naming 

This minor planet was named after Irish telescope maker Sir Howard Grubb (1844–1931), whose company Grubb Parson and Co., Newcastle upon Tyne, England, manufactured the 40-inch reflector of the discovering Simeiz Observatory. The official naming citation was mentioned in The Names of the Minor Planets by Paul Herget in 1955.

Physical characteristics 

Grubba is a common, stony S-type asteroid in both the Tholen and SMASS classification, which also agrees with the overall spectral type for the Florian asteroids.

Rotation period 

In August 2013, a rotational lightcurve of Grubba was obtained from photometric observations by Andrea Ferrero at the Bigmuskie Observatory  in Italy. Lightcurve analysis gave a longer than average rotation period of 46.30 hours with a brightness variation of 0.24 magnitude. The result supersedes observations by French amateur astronomers Laurent Bernasconi (>12 hours) and René Roy (>20 hours), as well as by astronomers at the University of Arizona (18 hours) in Tucson, United States. While not being a slow rotator, its period is significantly longer than that for most asteroids, which rotate every 2 to 20 hours once around their axis.

Diameter and albedo 

According to the surveys carried out by the Japanese Akari satellite and the NEOWISE mission of NASA's Wide-field Infrared Survey Explorer, Grubba measures between 10.920 and 13.03 kilometers in diameter and its surface has an albedo between 0.171 and 0.2416. The Collaborative Asteroid Lightcurve Link adopts an albedo of 0.133, and derives a diameter of 14.64 kilometers based on an absolute magnitude of 11.98.

References

External links 
 Lightcurve Database Query (LCDB), at www.minorplanet.info
 Dictionary of Minor Planet Names, Google books
 Asteroids and comets rotation curves, CdR – Observatoire de Genève, Raoul Behrend
 Discovery Circumstances: Numbered Minor Planets (1)-(5000) – Minor Planet Center
 
 

001058
001058
Discoveries by Grigory Shajn
Named minor planets
001058
001058
19250622